Sev Albrecht (born 26 April 2005) is a Swiss female handballer for HV Herzogenbuchsee in the Spar Premium League and the Swiss national team.

She made her official debut on the Swiss national team on 29 September 2022, against Norway. She represented Switzerland for the first time at the 2022 European Women's Handball Championship in Slovenia, Montenegro and North Macedonia.

References

External links

2005 births
Living people
Swiss female handball players
People from Lucerne
21st-century Swiss women